Yeonhui-dong is an administrative division and dong located in Seo District, Incheon Korea.  Yeonhui-dong is a mixed rural and urban use area based on flower gardens and farming, and was formed for commerce with the native farming region of Gongcheon-dong.

Overview

History 
 2000 Community Center built
 1995 January 1 Name changed to Incheon Metropolitan City, Seo-gu, Yeonhui-dong
 1988 January 1 Named change to Incheon Direct Controlled Municipality, Seo-gu, Yeonhui-dong
 1981 Named changed to Incheon Direct Controlled Municipality, Buk-gu, Yeonhui-dong
 1955 Gongchon-dong consolidated with Simgok-dong
 1914 Bukcheon-gun, Seogot-myeon

Administrative divisions 
 Yeonhui-dong
 Gongchon-dong
 Simgok-dong

Schools 
Incheon Seogot Elementary School
Incheon Cheongra Elementary School
Incheon Yangji Elementary School
Simgok Elementary School
Seogot Middle School
Daein High School
Incheon Design High School

Seo District, Incheon
Neighbourhoods in Incheon